Sipey Bluff is the bluff rising to 2270 m in Veregava Ridge, central Sentinel Range in Ellsworth Mountains, Antarctica. It surmounts Orizari Glacier to the south-southwest, Dater Glacier to the west and north, and Berisad Glacier to the east.

The peak is named after the settlement of Sipey in Southern Bulgaria.

Location
US mapping in 1961, updated in 1988.

Maps
 Vinson Massif.  Scale 1:250 000 topographic map.  Reston, Virginia: US Geological Survey, 1988.
 Antarctic Digital Database (ADD). Scale 1:250000 topographic map of Antarctica. Scientific Committee on Antarctic Research (SCAR). Since 1993, regularly updated.

Notes

References
 Sipey Peak. SCAR Composite Antarctic Gazetteer.
 Bulgarian Antarctic Gazetteer. Antarctic Place-names Commission. (details in Bulgarian, basic data in English)

External links
 Sipey Bluff. Copernix satellite image

Ellsworth Mountains
Mountains of Ellsworth Land
Bulgaria and the Antarctic